Persoonia rudis is a species of flowering plant in the family Proteaceae and is endemic to the south-west of Western Australia. It is an erect shrub with hairy young branchlets, linear leaves, and yellow flowers borne in groups of five to thirty on a rachis  that continues to grow after flowering.

Description

Taxonomy
Persoonia rudis was first formally described in 1856 by Carl Meissner in de Candolle's Prodromus Systematis Naturalis Regni Vegetabilis from specimens collected in the Swan River Colony by James Drummond.

Distribution and habitat
This geebung grows in low heath and forest between Three Springs and Mogumber in the Geraldton Sandplains, Jarrah Forest, Swan Coastal Plain biogeographic regions in the south-west of Western Australia.

Conservation status
Persoonia rudis is classified as "Priority Three" by the Government of Western Australia Department of Parks and Wildlife meaning that it is poorly known and known from only a few locations but is not under imminent threat.

References

rudis
Flora of Western Australia
Plants described in 1856
Taxa named by Carl Meissner